The 2005 Texas Tech Red Raiders football team represented Texas Tech University as a member of the Big 12 Conference during the 2005 NCAA Division I-A football season. In their sixth season under head coach Mike Leach, the Red Raiders compiled an overall record of 9–3 record with a mark of 6–2 in conference play, finished in a tie for second place in Southern Division of the Big 12, lost to Alabama in the 2006 Cotton Bowl Classic, and outscored opponents by a combined total of 473 to 226. The team played its home games at Jones SBC Stadium in Lubbock, Texas.

Previous season
The 2004 team finished the season with an overall record of 8–4, 5–3 in Big 12 play, finishing tied in third place in the Southern Division. The Red Raiders finished the regular season with a 31–15 upset victory over the no. 23 ranked Oklahoma State Cowboys. The team was invited to the Holiday Bowl, defeating no. 4 California 45–31. The 2004 team was ranked no. 18 and no. 17 in the final AP and Coaches' polls, respectively. Quarterback Sonny Cumbie finished the season leading the nation in passing yards, throwing for 4,742 yards.

NFL draftees

Schedule

Personnel

Game summaries

FIU

Sam Houston State

Indiana State

Kansas

at Nebraska

Kansas State

Quarterback Cody Hodges finished the game 44-of-65 for 643 yards with five touchdowns and two interceptions. Hodges's 643 passing yards are the fourth most by a quarterback in Division I-A (now Division I FBS) and the second time a Texas Tech quarterback threw for over 600 yards in a single game, with B. J. Symons throwing for 661 yards against Ole Miss in 2003.

at No. 2 Texas

at Baylor

Texas A&M

at Oklahoma State

Oklahoma

vs. No. 13 Alabama (Cotton Bowl Classic)

Rankings

Players drafted into the NFL

Notes

References

Texas Tech
Texas Tech Red Raiders football seasons
Texas Tech Red Raiders football